was a  after Saikō and before Jōgan. This period spanned the years from February 857 through April 859.

Change of Era
 January 30, 857 : The new era name was created to mark an event or series of events. The previous era ended and the new one commenced in Saikō 4, on the 21st day of the 2nd month of 857.

Events of the Ten'an era
 September 27, 858 (Ten'an 2, 27th day of the 8th month): Emperor Montoku dies. Korehito-shinnō receives the succession (senso). Shortly thereafter, Emperor Seiwa formally accedes to the throne (sokui).
 September 27, 858 (Ten'an 2, 27th day of the 8th month): In the 8th year of Montoku-tennōs reign (文徳天皇8年), the emperor abdicated; and the succession (senso) was received by his son. Shortly thereafter, Emperor Seiwa is said to have acceded to the throne (sokui).
 December 15, 858 (Ten'an 2, 7th day of the 11th month): The emperor's official announcement of his enthronement at age 9 was accompanied by the appointment or his grandfather as regent (sesshō). This is the first time  that this high honor has been accorded to a member of the Fujiwara family, and it is also the first example in Japan of the accession of an heir who is too young to be emperor. The proclamation of the beginning of Seiwa's reign was made at the Ise Shrine (Kotai-jingu) at Ise and at all the tombs of the imperial family.

Notes

References
 Brown, Delmer M. and Ichirō Ishida, eds. (1979).  Gukanshō: The Future and the Past. Berkeley: University of California Press. ;  OCLC 251325323
 Nussbaum, Louis-Frédéric and Käthe Roth. (2005).  Japan encyclopedia. Cambridge: Harvard University Press. ;  OCLC 58053128
 Titsingh, Isaac. (1834). Nihon Ōdai Ichiran; ou,  Annales des empereurs du Japon.  Paris: Royal Asiatic Society, Oriental Translation Fund of Great Britain and Ireland. OCLC 5850691
 Varley, H. Paul. (1980). A Chronicle of Gods and Sovereigns: Jinnō Shōtōki of Kitabatake Chikafusa. New York: Columbia University Press. ;  OCLC 6042764

External links 
 National Diet Library, "The Japanese Calendar" -- historical overview plus illustrative images from library's collection

Japanese eras
9th century in Japan
857 beginnings
859 endings